Blythewood is a town in South Carolina.

Blythewood may also refer to:
Blythewood (Amite City, Louisiana), a National Register of Historic Places listing in Tangipahoa Parish, Louisiana
Blythewood (Columbia, Tennessee), a National Register of Historic Places listing in Maury County, Tennessee

See also
Woodlands and Blythewood, Clarkesville, GA, listed on the NRHP in Georgia